Glena cognataria, the blueberry gray moth, is a moth native to North America. It ranges from Florida to Nova Scotia and New Brunswick.  Its larvae is hosted on blueberry. The habitat consists of bogs and pine barrens. It is listed as a species of special concern and believed extirpated in the US state of Connecticut.

The length of the forewings is about 13–15 mm. Adults are greyish brown with a pink or violet tint and weak wing markings.

The larvae have been recorded feeding on blueberry, as well as many hardwood species including oak, maple, cherry, willow and poplar.

References

Boarmiini
Moths described in 1831